The 1979 Liberty Bowl was the 21st edition of the college football bowl game, held at the Liberty Bowl in Memphis, Tennessee, on Saturday, December 22. Part of the 
1979–80 bowl game season, it matched the Tulane Green Wave and the Penn State Nittany Lions, both independents. In a game without a touchdown, Penn State won 9–6.

Teams

Penn State

The 1979 Penn State squad finished the regular season with a record of 7–4 and losses against Texas A&M, Nebraska, Miami and Pittsburgh. The appearance marked the third for Penn State in the Liberty Bowl, and the school's 18th overall bowl game.

Tulane

The 1979 Tulane squad finished the regular season with a record of 9–2 and losses against Rice and West Virginia. The appearance marked the second for Tulane in the Liberty Bowl, and the school's sixth overall bowl game.

Game summary

References

Liberty Bowl
Liberty Bowl
Penn State Nittany Lions football bowl games
Tulane Green Wave football bowl games
Liberty Bowl
December 1979 sports events in the United States